The 2019 German motorcycle Grand Prix was the ninth round of the 2019 MotoGP season. It was held at the Sachsenring in Hohenstein-Ernstthal on 7 July 2019. 

This round featured the first MotoE race. The class was originally meant to make its début at Jerez, but a fire in the paddock during pre-season testing destroyed all 18 bikes that were prepared and the Jerez round was cancelled along with the Le Mans round. All teams in the MotoE class use the Energica Ego Corsa.

Classification

MotoGP

Moto2

Moto3

MotoE

All bikes manufactured by Energica.

Championship standings after the race

MotoGP

Moto2

Moto3

MotoE

References

External links

German
Motorcycle Grand Prix
German motorcycle Grand Prix
German motorcycle Grand Prix